Elisa del Estal Mateu (born 23 March 1993) is a Spanish footballer who plays as a forward for Sevilla.

Club career
Eli del Estal started her career at Reocín. Her twin sister Sara is also a footballer; they were teammates at Reocín, and for one season at Espanyol.

References

External links
Profile at La Liga

1993 births
Living people
Women's association football forwards
Spanish women's footballers
Footballers from Santander, Spain
Fundación Albacete players
RCD Espanyol Femenino players
Incheon Hyundai Steel Red Angels WFC players
Sevilla FC (women) players
Primera División (women) players
Spanish expatriate women's footballers
Spanish expatriate sportspeople in South Korea
Expatriate women's footballers in South Korea
SD Reocín (women) players
Twin sportspeople
Spanish twins